Tarakäkä Peak is a peak  east-northeast of Ainley Peak in the Kyle Hills on Ross Island. The name Tarakäkä (meaning "southwest wind") is one of several Māori wind names applied by the New Zealand Geographic Board in this area.

References

Mountains of Ross Island